Shahid Haj Qasem is an Iranian ballistic missile which was unveiled on 20 August 2020. It is named after the Iranian commander Qasem Soleimani, who was assassinated by the US in January 2020.

According to Tasnim News, this missile is considered as the new generation of Fateh-110, and it has the capability to pass the "missile defense system".

The revealing of the Haj-Qasem and Abu-Mahdi missiles came a day after Washington mentioned that it would activate a controversial mechanism aimed at reimposing UN sanctions on Islamic Republic of Iran, the so-called "snapback" procedure.

Abu Mahdi missile 

On August 20, 2020, as well as unveiling the "Haj-Qasem (Soleimani) missile", Iran unveiled another missile; the Abu Mahdi. The Abu-Mahdi is a naval cruise missile.

See also 
 Abu Mahdi (missile)
 Ministry of Defence and Armed Forces Logistics (Iran)
 Fateh-110
 Zolfaghar (missile)
 Dezful (missile)
 List of military equipment manufactured in Iran
 Science and technology in Iran
 Kheibar Shekan (missile)

References

Medium-range ballistic missiles of Iran
Surface-to-surface missiles of Iran
Weapons and ammunition introduced in 2020